Bagh-e Maruf (also Romanized as Bāgh-e Ma‘rūf, Bāgh Ma‘rūf, and Bāghe Ma’roof; also known as Bal Marit) is a village in Aji Chay Rural District of the Central District of Tabriz County, East Azerbaijan province, Iran. At the 2006 National Census, its population was 7,961 in 2,033 households. The following census in 2011 counted 11,233 people in 3,223 households. The latest census in 2016 showed a population of 12,068 people in 3,695 households; it was the largest village in its rural district.

References 

Tabriz County

Populated places in East Azerbaijan Province

Populated places in Tabriz County